Akhtakhana may refer to:
 Dzorastan, Armenia
 Axtaxana, Azerbaijan